El Campello is a town on the Costa Blanca of Spain, within the  Valencian Community. It is a 20-minute tram ride from Alicante city. There is a busy marina and fish market.

The tower overlooking the harbour was built in the 16th century as a lookout for Berber pirates.  During the day, smoke signals warned other towers along the coast of the pirates' pending arrival, and fires were lit when it was dark.

During October each year, the town holds its moros i cristians (Moors and Christians) festival. The festival includes daily "battles" through the town, where arquebuses are extensively used. There are numerous parades and late night fireworks displays. The evening parades through the centre of the town are resplendent with extravagant costumes.

Places to visit
There are archaeological remains at 'La Illeta' (in Valencian), beside the harbour, where circular cabins dating back to 3000 BC have been found. Also known as  'Banyets de la Reina', the remains of Roman-era fish factories can be seen at the site.

It is an archaeological site of great importance and occupies 4,000 square meters. A number of items were discovered, including was Bronze Age remains, and the remains of an important Iberian population that occupied that place during the second and third centuries BC, and the remains of a Roman villa of the second century, including four fish ponds dug into the rock of the same time (though badly eroded, yet visible), and finally the remains of an Arab occupation that was more sporadic in the Middle Ages.

Education

Lycée Français d'Alicante, a French international school, is in El Campello. The school moved to El Campello in 2005.

Gallery

References

External links

Map Location
Beachfront Webcam

Municipalities in the Province of Alicante
Alacantí
Seaside resorts in Spain